Titova is a rural locality (a village) in Yurlinskoye Rural Settlement, Yurlinsky District, Perm Krai, Russia. The population was 206 as of 2010. There are 5 streets.

Geography 
Titova is located 10 km southwest of Yurla (the district's administrative centre) by road. Fokina is the nearest rural locality.

References 

Rural localities in Yurlinsky District